XXL  is a 1997 French comedy directed by Ariel Zeitoun.

Plot
Alain Berrebi directs with his sister Lorène, a company of ready-to-wear in the Path. Their business is booming to the point to consider acquiring a nearby shop, which belongs to David Stern, the father of his fiancée Arlette. The case seems about to arrive when Mr. Stern learns that Baptiste Bourdalou, who once saved his life from death camps during World War II, has died ...

Cast

 Gérard Depardieu : Jean Bourdalou 
 Michel Boujenah : Alain Berrebi 
 Catherine Jacob : Lorène Benguigui 
 Elsa Zylberstein : Arlette Stern 
 Emmanuelle Riva : Sonia Stern
 Maurice Chevit : David Stern 
 Pascal Elbé : François Stern
 Gina Lollobrigida : Gaby Berrebi
 Gad Elmaleh : Sammy 
 Pierre Zimmer : Baptiste Bourdalou
 Eriq Ebouaney : Omar
 Karen Strassman : Press Officer
 Samir Guesmi : Pizza delivery
 Vincent Tulli : The driver

References

External links

1997 films
1990s French-language films
1997 comedy films
French comedy films
Films scored by Goran Bregović
Films directed by Ariel Zeitoun
1990s French films